The 1980 NBA Expansion Draft was the seventh expansion draft of the National Basketball Association (NBA). The draft was held on May 28, 1980, so that the newly founded Dallas Mavericks could acquire players for the upcoming 1980–81 season. Dallas had been awarded the expansion team on February 3, 1980. In an NBA expansion draft, new NBA teams are allowed to acquire players from the previously established teams in the league. Not all players on a given team are available during an expansion draft, since each team can protect a certain number of players from being selected. In this draft, each of the twenty-two other NBA teams had protected eight players from their roster and the Mavericks selected twenty-two unprotected players, one from each team.

The Mavericks were formed and owned by a group headed by Don Carter and Norm Sonju. Washington Bullets head coach and  Coach of the Year Dick Motta was hired as the franchise's first head coach. The Mavericks' went with young players in the expansion draft and avoided selecting experienced players with large contracts or injury problems. Eighteen of the twenty-two players chosen had less than three years of NBA experience. The Mavericks' selections included former first overall pick Austin Carr, one-time All-Defensive Team Jim Cleamons and eleven-year veteran Bingo Smith. However, Cleamons and Smith never played for the Mavericks and Carr only played briefly before he was sold to the Washington Bullets. Eleven of the selections were former first-round draft picks. Eleven players from the expansion draft joined the Mavericks for their inaugural season, but only two played more than one season for the team. Tom LaGarde played two seasons and Jim Spanarkel played four seasons for the Mavericks.

Key

Selections

Notes
 Number of years played in the NBA prior to the draft
 Never played a game for the franchise
 Abdul Jeelani was known as Gary Cole during his college career.

References
General

Specific

External links
NBA.com
NBA.com: NBA Draft History

Expansion
Dallas Mavericks lists
National Basketball Association expansion draft
National Basketball Association lists
NBA expansion draft